Dynevor School was a secondary school in Swansea, Wales, at times co-educational and at others for boys only.  It was closed in 2002.  The school's premises have been re-developed and are now used by the University of Wales Trinity Saint David (UWTSD).

The memory of the School is maintained in the form of the Old Dy’vorians Association which  aims to:
 Provide a means for keeping past pupils and staff of the School in touch with one another.
 Take an interest in supporting educational development in Swansea and its environs by using the skills.
 Garner and conserve material relating to the history, heritage and outreach of Dynevor School and its staff and pupils from its foundation as a Higher Grade School in Trinity Place in 1883, in order to secure, maintain and promote a literary, physical, audio, and digital archive resource.

More information about the Dy’vorians’ Association may be found at: Dynevor Revisited.

History
The school opened in 1883 and moved to Dynevor Place in 1894 where it could accommodate 500 pupils. In 1907 it became Swansea Municipal Secondary School. In 1930 it changed its name to Dynevor School and from 1942 it was known as Dynevor Secondary Grammar School. In September 1971 it became a comprehensive school which amalgamated with Llwyn-y-Bryn Girls' School in 1978.

Notable former pupils
  
 Spencer Davis
 Nigel Evans, Conservative MP
 Flora Forster, educator
 Kevin Johns, actor and radio presenter
 Julian Lewis, Conservative MP
 David Mercer, (1960-1967), sports commentator
 Anthony Edward Pierce, Bishop of Swansea and Brecon from 1998 until 2008
 Mal Pope, musician and composer
 Sir Harry Secombe, comedian and entertainer
 Douglas Simons, local architect of schools and hospitals
 Christopher Rees, former Chair of the International Bar Association and Managing Partner of Bird & Bird LLP
 Rowan Williams, former Archbishop of Canterbury

References

External links
 Swansea Heritage: Dynevor School

History of Swansea
People educated at Dynevor School, Swansea